Project Blue Book was an American historical drama television series that premiered on History on January 8, 2019. The main role of Dr. J. Allen Hynek is played by Aidan Gillen, and the first season consisted of ten episodes. The series is based on the real-life Project Blue Book, a series of studies on unidentified flying objects conducted by the United States Air Force. On February 10, 2019, History renewed the series for a 10-episode second season which premiered on January 21, 2020. In May 2020, it was announced that the series had been canceled.

Premise
The series revolves around the real-life Project Blue Book, a secret series of investigations into supposed UFO encounters and unexplained phenomena undertaken by the United States Air Force with skeptical astrophysics professor — and eventual ufologist — Dr. J. Allen Hynek in the 1950s and 1960s. With his partner, Air Force veteran Captain Michael Quinn, they investigate sightings across the U.S., and Dr. Hynek discovers that not everything can be explained by science.

Cast and characters

Main 
 Aidan Gillen as Dr. J. Allen Hynek, an astronomer, astrophysicist, professor and UFOlogist working on Project Blue Book. Skeptical about the existence of alien life and UFOs in the beginning, Hynek attempts to explain the cases using his analytical and scientific mind.
Michael Malarkey as Captain Michael Quinn, a decorated veteran who served with the United States Army Air Force as a pilot during World War II, and working with Dr. Hynek on Project Blue Book. The character is inspired by USAF Captain Edward J. Ruppelt, the first director of the real-life Project Blue Book.
 Laura Mennell as Mimi Hynek, Allen Hynek's wife.
 Ksenia Solo as Susie Miller, a friend and neighbour of Mimi Hynek, also a KGB agent.
 Michael Harney as General Hugh Valentine, a high-ranking military official, and founder of Project Blue Book. The character is inspired by USAF Major General Charles P. Cabell, the founder of the real-life Project Blue Book.
 Neal McDonough as General James Harding, a high-ranking military official and a co-founder of Project Blue Book. The character is inspired by USAF Brigadier General William Garland, a member of General Charles P. Cabell staff during the time period of the real-life Project Blue Book.

Recurring
 Robert John Burke as William Fairchild, United States Secretary of Defense.
 Ian Tracey as "The Fixer" a.k.a. "The Man in the Hat" (later revealed to be one of the Men In Black), a mysterious man who follows Dr. Hynek.
 Matt O'Leary as Lieutenant Henry Fuller, a USAF pilot whom Hynek and Quinn meet on their first case.
 Nicholas Holmes as Joel Hynek, Mimi and Allen's son.
 Currie Graham as Susie’s Associate, also a KGB agent.
 Jill Morrison as Faye, a member of the Air Force and Captain Quinn's secretary at Wright Patterson Air Force Base.
 Michael Imperioli as Edward Rizzuto, an American/Russian double agent.

Historical figures
 Adam Greydon Reid as Donald Keyhoe (spelled in the credits as "Kehoe"), an American writer and UFO researcher. Keyhoe was widely regarded as the leader in the field of UFOlogy in the 1950s and early to mid-1960s, appearing in the episode entitled "The Lubbock Lights".
 Thomas Kretschmann as Wernher von Braun, a German-American aerospace engineer. Von Braun was the leading figure in the development of rocket technology in Nazi Germany, before coming to the U.S. to develop rockets for NASA, appearing in "Operation Paperclip".
 Bob Gunton as President Harry S. Truman, 33rd President of the United States, appearing in "The Washington Merry-Go Round".
 Caspar Phillipson as Senator John F. Kennedy, appearing in Season 2. Phillipson reprises his role from the 2016 biographical drama film Jackie and its 2017 spin-off short film The Speech JFK Never Gave, later reprising the role again in the 2022 biographical fiction film Blonde, in which he had portrayed an older Kennedy as the President of the United States.

Episodes

Season 1 (2019)

Season 2 (2020)

Production
The series was filmed in Vancouver, British Columbia, Canada. It was co-produced by the History Channel and A&E Studios. Filming on the second season began on July 15, 2019, and was expected to conclude on November 13, 2019.

Reception

Critical reception
On the review aggregator website Rotten Tomatoes, the series has an approval rating of 65% based on 17 reviews, with an average rating of 6.65/10. The website's critical consensus reads, "Project Blue Book will likely intrigue fans of the paranormal with its loose adaptation of historically unexplained phenomena, but this buttoned-down series lacks the narrative verve to appeal beyond the true believers." Metacritic, which uses a weighted average, assigned a score of 56 out of 100 based on 10 critics, indicating "mixed or average reviews".

Paranormal investigator and skeptic Robert Sheaffer, reviewing the first four episodes, argued there are historical inaccuracies which extend beyond the claim of being based on real events.

Ratings

Season 1

Season 2

References

External links
 
 
 Project Blue Book on Instagram
 

2019 American television series debuts
2020 American television series endings
2010s American drama television series
2020s American drama television series
2010s American science fiction television series
2020s American science fiction television series
English-language television shows
Historical television series
Television series set in the 1950s
Television series set in the 1960s
History (American TV channel) original programming
Television series based on actual events
Television shows set in the United States
UFO-related television
Television shows filmed in Vancouver
Television series about the United States Air Force